The women's single sculls competition at the 2012 Summer Olympics in London took place are at Dorney Lake which, for the purposes of the Games venue, is officially termed Eton Dorney.

Schedule

All times are British Summer Time (UTC+1)

Results

Heats
First four of each heat qualify to the quarterfinals, remainder goes to the repechage.

Heat 1

Heat 2

Heat 3

Heat 4

Heat 5

Repechage
First two qualify to the quarterfinals.

Repechage 1

Repechage 2

Quarterfinals
First three qualify to the semifinals.

Quarterfinal 1

Quarterfinal 2

Quarterfinal 3

Quarterfinal 4

Semifinals

Semifinals C/D
First three qualify to Final C, remainder to Final D.

Semifinal 1

Semifinal 2

Semifinals A/B
First three qualify to Final A, remainder to Final B.

Semifinal 1

Semifinal 2

Finals

Final E

Final D

Final C

Final B

Final A

References

Women's single sculls
Women's single sculls